Surabaya Gubeng Station, known as Spoorwegstation Goebeng Soerabaja during the Dutch East Indies era, is a railway station located at Gubeng Station Street, Pacarkeling, Tambaksari, Surabaya, East Java, Indonesia. 
This station is the biggest railway station in Surabaya and East Java, and is a departure from the main railway in Surabaya, especially towards the south and east, while the train that passes through the northern route, such as majors train Jakarta via Semarang, departed from Surabaya Pasar Turi Station.

Surabaya Gubeng station was first built on the west side of the railway tracks. In the mid-1990s, new Surabaya Gubeng station building was built on the east side of railway tracks, which are wider and has more modern architecture.

Services
Passenger trains that use this station are :
 Executive Class
 Argo Wilis to 
 Bima to 
 Bangunkarta to 
 Turangga to 
 Executive and Business Class
 Executive and Premium Economy Class
 Mutiara Selatan to 
 Mutiara Timur to 
 Sancaka to 
Executive and Economy Plus Class
 Gaya Baru Malam Selatan to 
Business and Economy Class
Premium Economy Class
 Jayakarta Premium to  via 
Economy Plus Class
 Jayabaya to  via - and 
Economy Class
 Pasundan to 
 Probowangi to 
Commuter and Local Train
 Komuter Surabaya–Bangil to  via 
 Komuter Surabaya–Pasuruan to  via 
 Komuter Jenggala to 
 Dhoho to  via 
 Penataran to  via 
 Kertosono Local  Train to 
 Tumapel to

References

External links
 

Railway stations in Surabaya
Railway stations opened in 1878
Dutch colonial architecture in Indonesia